Werfenweng is a municipality in the St. Johann im Pongau district in the state of Salzburg in Austria.

Population

Politics

The Mayor is Dr.Peter Brandauer from the ÖVP party.

See also

 Alpine pearls
 Salzburgerland
 Salzburg

References

External links
Alpine Pearls (Soft Mobility in the Alps)
Werfenweng municipality
Tourist Board Werfenweng

Tennen Mountains
Cities and towns in St. Johann im Pongau District